Jenna Rose Burkert (born May 9, 1993) is an American freestyle wrestler. She won one of the bronze medals in the women's 55 kg event at the 2021 World Wrestling Championships held in Oslo, Norway.

Career 

She competed in the girls' freestyle 60 kg event at the 2010 Summer Youth Olympics held in Singapore.

She also competed in the women's 60 kg event at the 2014 World Wrestling Championships in Tashkent, Uzbekistan, in the women's 59 kg event at the 2018 World Wrestling Championships in Budapest, Hungary and in the women's 57 kg event at the 2019 World Wrestling Championships in Nur-Sultan, Kazakhstan.

In 2019, she won the silver medal in the women's 57 kg event at the Pan American Games held in Lima, Peru. In 2021, she won one of the bronze medals in the women's 55 kg event at the World Wrestling Championships held in Oslo, Norway.

Achievements

References

External links 

 

Living people
1993 births
Place of birth missing (living people)
American female sport wrestlers
Wrestlers at the 2010 Summer Youth Olympics
Pan American Games medalists in wrestling
Pan American Games silver medalists for the United States
Wrestlers at the 2019 Pan American Games
Medalists at the 2019 Pan American Games
World Wrestling Championships medalists
21st-century American women